Glenn Sharpe (born February 27, 1984) is an American football cornerback who last played for the Indianapolis Colts of the National Football League. He was signed by the Atlanta Falcons as an undrafted free agent in 2008. He played college football at the University of Miami.

Sharpe has also been a member of the New Orleans Saints.

College career
Sharpe played college football for the Miami Hurricanes. He is widely known as the player involved in the pass interference penalty in the 2003 Fiesta Bowl that prevented the Hurricanes from completing back-to-back National Championships and undefeated seasons.

Professional career
Sharpe won a Super Bowl ring with the New Orleans Saints as a practice squad member when the Saints defeated the Indianapolis Colts in Super Bowl XLIV, 31-17. He was waived on June 21, 2010. He was signed by the Indianapolis Colts on August 23, 2010.  He was released on September 4, 2010.

Murder case
On February 22, 2012, Sharpe was arrested and charged with murder in DeKalb County, Georgia. He is being held in the Dekalb County jail without bail. Reports in 2016 were that charges were dropped against Sharpe and that he remained a resident of Atlanta, Georgia.

References

External links
Miami Hurricanes bio

1984 births
Living people
Players of American football from Miami
American football cornerbacks
Miami Hurricanes football players
Atlanta Falcons players
New Orleans Saints players
Indianapolis Colts players